Kokerbin Rock, also known as Kokerbin Hill, is a granite rock formation located within Kokerbin Nature Reserve in the Wheatbelt region of Western Australia. The area has special significance for the Nyoongar. There are claims that Kokerbin Rock is the third largest monolith in Australia, with Mount Wudinna in South Australia being the second largest and Uluru in the Northern Territory being the largest. 

Description 

Caves, rock formations, and the summit are accessible by marked bush walks.
The rock formations include a wave rock formation, Dog Rock and Devil's Marbles. On the western side of Kokerbin Rock is a historic stone well and an old school site, remainders of early European settlement.

A picnic area and toilet facilities are located on the eastern side of Kokerbin Rock.

{ 
"type": "ExternalData", 
"service": "geoshape", 
"ids": "Q16893567",
}

See also 

 Protected areas of Western Australia
 Granite outcrops of Western Australia

References

Further reading 

Rock formations of Western Australia
Monoliths of Australia
Nature reserves in Western Australia
Avon Wheatbelt